Struggle for Freedom and Democracy Day may refer to:
 A public holiday in the Czech Republic, see Public holidays in the Czech Republic
 A public holiday in Slovakia, see Public holidays in Slovakia